Goodenia decursiva is a species of flowering plant in the family Goodeniaceae and endemic to the south coast of Western Australia. It is an erect shrub with dense, more or less stem-clasping, toothed, elliptic to egg-shaped leaves almost obscuring the stem, and compact thyrses of white flowers.

Description

Taxonomy and naming
Goodenia decursiva was first formally described in 1905 by William Vincent Fitzgerald in the Journal of the West Australian Natural History Society from material collected in "sandy ground on the side of granite hill, Esperance, October, 1903" by Cecil Andrews. The specific epithet (decursiva) means "decurrent", referring to the leaves.

Distribution and habitat
This goodenia grows in sandy soil on granite outcrops and hills, mostly near the sea, along the south coast of Western Australia between Esperance and Israelite Bay in the Esperance Plains and Mallee biogeographic regions.

Conservation status
Goddenia decursiva is classified as "not threatened" by the Department of Environment and Conservation (Western Australia).

References

decursiva
Eudicots of Western Australia
Plants described in 1905
Taxa named by William Vincent Fitzgerald